Dmitri Dmitriyevich Tananeyev (born 12 May 1998) is a Russian football player. He plays for FC Rodina-2 Moscow.

Club career
He made his debut in the Russian Football National League for FC Shinnik Yaroslavl on 8 August 2020 in a game against FC Akron Tolyatti, he substituted Ivan Oleynikov in the 90th minute.

References

External links
 
 Profile by Russian Football National League
 

1998 births
Footballers from Tunis
Living people
Russian footballers
Association football defenders
FC Rostov players
FC Shinnik Yaroslavl players
FC Chayka Peschanokopskoye players
FC Nosta Novotroitsk players